Saint Frances is a 2019 film, directed by Alex Thompson, written by Kelly O'Sullivan and starring O'Sullivan, Ramona Edith Williams, Charin Alvarez, Lily Mojekwu and Max Lipchitz. The film was nominated for the Independent Spirit John Cassavetes Award in 2020.

Plot 
Bridget, a 34 year old, gets a job nannying six-year-old Frances. Bridget's unwanted pregnancy and abortion raise many complications.

Cast 
 Kelly O'Sullivan as Bridget
 Ramona Edith Williams as Frances
 Charin Alvarez as Maya
 Lily Mojekwu as Annie
 Max Lipchitz as Jace
 Jim True-Frost as Isaac
 Mary Beth Fisher as Carol
 Francis Guinan as Dennis
 Rebecca Spence as Joan

Release

Critical response 
The website's critical consensus reads, "Saint Frances approaches an array of weighty issues with empathy, humor, and grace -- and marks star and writer Kelly O'Sullivan as a tremendous talent to watch." Metacritic, which uses a weighted average, assigned the film a score of 83 out of 100, based on 20 critics, indicating "Universal Acclaim".

Peter Debruge writing for Variety wrote, "Saint Frances takes a stand in letting the character figure things out for herself, while illuminating those things — like pregnancy and her period — that she shouldn’t have to". Hau Chu of The Washington Post wrote, "O’Sullivan’s script wobbles when the focus shifts from that dynamic". David Rooney of The Hollywood Reporter wrote, "Thompson's direction and O'Sullivan's screenplay are more often characterized by their light touch than their missteps in a likeable film elevated by its crisp, summery look and warm score".

Awards and nominations

References

External links 

 

2019 films
2019 comedy-drama films
2010s American films
American comedy-drama films
Films about abortion
2019 independent films